George Neal (14 January 1894 – 20 October 1955) was a British sports shooter. He competed in the team clay pigeon event at the 1924 Summer Olympics.

References

External links
 

1894 births
1955 deaths
British male sport shooters
Olympic shooters of Great Britain
Shooters at the 1924 Summer Olympics
People from North Norfolk (district)